Greg Calabrese is an American actor who played the recurring character of Trevor on CBS daytime drama The Young and the Restless.
He is now a math teacher at Jenks Freshman Academy in Jenks, Oklahoma, as well as an assistant football coach for Jenks High School.

External links

Year of birth missing (living people)
Living people
American male soap opera actors
People from Jenks, Oklahoma
Place of birth missing (living people)